Francis Hart Vicesimus Guinness (c.1820 – 18 September 1891) was a New Zealand police officer, magistrate and labour organiser. He was born in Dublin, Ireland on c.1820. A member of the Guinness family, he was the father of politician Arthur Guinness.

References

1820s births
1891 deaths
New Zealand police officers
District Court of New Zealand judges
People from Dublin (city)
Irish emigrants to New Zealand (before 1923)
Colony of New Zealand judges
Frank
19th-century Irish businesspeople